The Ring and the Book is a long dramatic narrative poem, and, more specifically, a verse novel, of 21,000 lines, written by Robert Browning. It was published in four volumes from 1868 to 1869 by Smith, Elder & Co.

Plot outline
The book tells the story of a murder trial in Rome in 1698, whereby an impoverished nobleman, Count Guido Franceschini, is found guilty of the murders of his young wife Pompilia (Comparini) and her parents, having suspected his wife was having an affair with a young cleric, Giuseppe Caponsacchi. Having been found guilty despite his protests and sentenced to death, Guido then appeals—unsuccessfully—to Pope Innocent XII to overturn the conviction. The poem comprises twelve books, ten of which are dramatic monologues spoken by different characters involved in the case (Count Guido speaks twice), usually giving a different account of the same events, and two books (the first and the last) spoken by the author.

Books making up the full poem
 The Ring and the Book
 Half-Rome
 The Other Half-Rome
 Tertium Quid
 Count Guido Franceschini
 Giuseppe Caponsacchi
 Pompilia
 Dominus Hyacinthus de Archangelis
 Juris Doctor Johannes Baptista Bottinius
 Pope Innocent XII
 Guido
 The Book and the Ring

Major characters
Count Guido Franceschini
Pompilia Comparini, his wife
Pietro and Violante Comparini, her putative parents
Giuseppe Caponsacchi, a priest
Pope Innocent XII

Conception and analysis
The poem is based on a real-life case. Under Roman law at the time, trials were not held in open court but rather by correspondence, whereupon each witness was required to submit a written statement for future adjudication. Browsing in a flea market in Florence in 1860, Browning came across a large volume of these written statements relating to the 1698 Franceschini case, and bought it on the spot. This volume – later known as the Yellow Book, after the colour of its aged covers – struck Browning as an excellent basis for a poem, but he was unable to get any further than the basic idea and often offered it as a subject to other writers, notably Alfred Tennyson, upon which to base a poem or novel. Luckily for posterity, there were no takers, and following his wife's death and his return to England, Browning revived his old plan for a long poem based on the Roman murder case almost eight years after the idea had first struck him.

The first book features a narrator, possibly Browning himself, who relates the story of how he came across the Yellow Book in the market and then giving a broad outline of the plot. The next two books give the views and gossip of the Roman public, apparently divided over which side to support in the famous case, who give differing accounts of the circumstances surrounding the case and the events which took place. Book 4 is spoken by a lawyer, Tertium Quid, who has no connection to the case but gives what he claims is a balanced, unbiased view of proceedings. Book 5 sees the start of the testimony from the trial, allowing the accused murderer Franceschini to give his side of the story, Book 6 is the young priest who was accused of being Pompilia's lover, and who asserts no adultery took place, that he simply tried to help Pompilia escape her abusive husband. Book 7 is the account of the dying Pompilia, mortally wounded but not killed in the attack.

Books 8 and 9 consist of depositions by the two opposing trial lawyers, and are filled with legal bickering and discussion of minute pieces of evidence that may or may not be related to the case as a whole; these could be interpreted as representing Browning's somewhat humorous attacks on the convoluted English and European legal system. Book 10 is perhaps the best-known of the monologues in the poem, as Pope Innocent considers Franceschini's appeal against a wider backdrop of moral and theological questions, including well-wrought reflections on the nature of good and evil. However, the Pope ultimately rejects the Franceschini's plea. Book 11 is similarly well-regarded and features Franceschini in his cell the night before his execution, wherein he begs for his life and seems, at times, to lose his mind. Book 12 returns to the initial narrator's voice (which may not or may be Browning's), which chronicles the conclusion and implications of the trial, as well as the poem.

Reception and reputation
The Ring and the Book was, by some margin, the best-selling of all Browning's works during his lifetime. The depth of its philosophical, psychological, and spiritual insight is a step up from anything Browning produced before or after, and the poem was almost universally hailed as a work of genius, restoring the pioneering reputation among the first rank of English poets which Browning had lost with Sordello nearly thirty years previously. The book lost popularity with readers during the 20th century; after its printing by Scribner's in the early twentieth-century, The Ring and the Book was printed by W. W. Norton & Company in the 1960s and 1970s. It is now currently available, though still difficult to acquire affordably or in a non-scholarly reading edition, by Broadview Press.

Facsimile, translated, and free digital copies of the Old Yellow Book (the source documents for the poem) are also available, and they reveal the extent of conjecture and invention Browning used when writing the poem. After Browning's death, a cache of documents relating to the case almost twice the size of the Yellow Book was found in an Italian library in the 1920s.

Browning's son Pen donated the Old Yellow Book and a ring of Browning's to Balliol College, Oxford University. The ring was mistakenly thought to be the one described in the poem.

Adaptations
The story is re-told in Derek Parker's 2001 true crime book Roman Murder Mystery: The True Story of Pompilia.

In July 2008, a two part play adaptation of this story, set in poetry and prose by Martyn Wade and starring Anton Lesser as Browning, Roger Allam as Guido Franceschini and Louise Brealey as Pompilia, was broadcast as the BBC Radio 4 "Classic Serial". Abigail le Fleming produced and directed.

Notes

External links 
 Hodell, Charles W. The Old Yellow Book facsimile and translation, published by the Carnegie Institution of Washington (1908), at the Internet Archive.
 Parker, Derek. Roman Murder Mystery: the true story of Pompilia, published by Sutton Publishing, UK. (2001)
 

1868 poems
British poems
Poetry by Robert Browning
Verse novels
Historical poems
Smith, Elder & Co books